Lang is a municipality in the district of Leibnitz in the Austrian state of Styria.

Subdivisions
It is divided into the villages Göttling, Lang, Langaberg, Dexenberg, Schirka, Stangersdorf, and Jöß.

References

Cities and towns in Leibnitz District